Hamsou Garba (sometimes Habsou) (25 December 1958 – 5 December 2022) was a Nigerien singer.

A native of Maradi, Garba attended a French-run school for a while when she was a child, but left it to transfer to an Arabic-French madrassa instead, which afforded her the opportunity to sing. Her emergence as a performer was so important politically that she was granted a state position at city hall, with wages. Besides singing, she has worked as a talk radio host during her career as well; she has also performed with the group Anashua or Annashuwa, of which she was a founding member at its establishment in 1991. Her first album, Gargadi, was only released in 2008; it was followed in 2009 by Tout est possible, and as of 2011 she was working on two more, Les hommes de l’histoire and Aouran dollé. As a performer she has traveled widely throughout West Africa. Her songs cover traditional themes such as love and religious affairs, as well as more political subjects such as public health. Garba has remained politically active throughout much of her career, and has been an outspoken supporter of the Nigerien Democratic Movement for an African Federation and its leader, Hama Amadou. For this she was jailed in Niamey for a time in 2016, having been accused by the authorities of inciting civil disobedience for writing and performing a song describing Amadou as "Niger's Mandela" and calling for the presidency of Mahamadou Issoufou to end like that of Goodluck Jonathan.

Garba's work has been discussed in the book Engaging Modernity: Muslim Women and the Politics of Agency in Postcolonial Niger by Ousseina Alidou.

Garba died on 5 December 2022, at the age of 63.

References

1958 births
2022 deaths
20th-century Nigerien women singers
21st-century Nigerien women singers
People from Maradi Region